The Roman Catholic Diocese of Ndola is a diocese located in Ndola, the third largest city in Zambia.

History
 January 8, 1938: Established as Apostolic Prefecture of Ndola from the Apostolic Prefecture of Broken Hill
 January 13, 1949: Promoted as Apostolic Vicariate of Ndola
 April 25, 1959: Promoted as Diocese of Ndola

Bishops
 Prefect Apostolic of Ndola (Roman rite)
 Fr. Francis Costantin Mazzieri, O.F.M. Conv. (1938 – 1949.01.13 see below)
 Vicar Apostolic of Ndola (Roman rite)
 Bishop Francis Costantin Mazzieri, O.F.M. Conv. (see above 1949.01.13 – 1959.04.25 see below)
 Bishops of Ndola (Roman rite)
 Bishop Francis Costantin Mazzieri, O.F.M. Conv. (see above 1959.04.25 – 1965.11.26)
 Bishop Nicola Agnozzi, O.F.M. Conv. (1966.02.01 – 1975.07.10), resigned; later appointed Bishop of Ariano, Italy
 Bishop Dennis Harold De Jong (1975.07.10 – 2003.09.17)
 Bishop Noel Charles O'Regan, S.M.A. (2004.10.01 - 2010.01.16)
 Bishop Alick Banda (2010.01.16 - 2018.01.30), appointed Archbishop of Lusaka and Apostolic Administrator here
 Bishop Benjamin S. Phiri (2020.07.03 - )

Coadjutor Bishop
Alick Banda (2009-2010)

Auxiliary Bishop
Nicola Agnozzi, O.F.M. Conv. (1962-1966), appointed Bishop here

Other priests of this diocese who became bishops
Alick Banda, appointed Bishop of Solwezi in 2007; later returned here as Coadjutor
Charles Joseph Sampa Kasonde, appointed Bishop of Solwezi in 2010

See also
Roman Catholicism in Zambia

Sources
 GCatholic.org
 Catholic Hierarchy

Roman Catholic dioceses in Zambia
Christian organizations established in 1938
Roman Catholic dioceses and prelatures established in the 20th century
1938 establishments in Northern Rhodesia
Roman Catholic Ecclesiastical Province of Lusaka